The rook (♖, ♜) is a piece in the game of chess. It may move any number of squares horizontally or vertically without jumping, and it may  an enemy piece on its path; additionally, it may participate in castling. Each player starts the game with two rooks, one in each corner on their own side of the board.

Formerly, the rook (from Persian رخ rokh/rukh, meaning "chariot") was alternatively called the tower, marquess, rector, and comes (count or earl). The term "castle" is considered to be informal, incorrect, or old-fashioned.

Placement and movement

The white rooks start on the squares a1 and h1, while the black rooks start on a8 and h8. The rook moves horizontally or vertically, through any number of unoccupied squares. The rook cannot jump over pieces. The rook may capture an enemy piece by moving to the square on which the enemy piece stands, removing it from play. The rook also participates with the king in a special move called castling, wherein it is transferred to the square crossed by the king after the king is shifted two squares toward the rook.

Strategy

Relative value
The rook is worth about five pawns. In general, rooks are stronger than bishops or knights  and are considered greater in value than either of those pieces by nearly two pawns, but less valuable than two minor pieces by approximately a pawn. Two rooks are generally considered to be worth slightly more than a queen (see chess piece relative value). Winning a rook for a bishop or knight is referred to as winning the exchange. Rooks and queens are called major pieces or heavy pieces, as opposed to bishops and knights, the minor pieces.

Development
In that position, the rooks support each other and can more easily move to occupy and control the most favorable .

A common strategic goal is to  a rook on the first rank of an open file (i.e., one unobstructed by pawns of either player) or a half-open file (i.e., one unobstructed by friendly pawns). From this position, the rook is relatively unexposed to risk but can exert control on every square on the file. If one file is particularly important, a player might advance one rook on it, then position the other rook behind—doubling the rooks.

A rook on the seventh rank (the opponent's second rank) is typically very powerful, as it threatens the opponent's unadvanced pawns and hems in the enemy king. A rook on the seventh rank is often considered sufficient compensation for a pawn. In the diagrammed position from a game between Lev Polugaevsky and Larry Evans, the rook on the seventh rank enables White to draw, despite being a pawn down.

Two rooks on the seventh rank are often enough to force victory by the blind swine mate, or at least a draw by perpetual check.

Endgame
Rooks are most powerful towards the end of a game (i.e., the endgame), when they can move unobstructed by pawns and control large numbers of squares. They are somewhat clumsy at restraining enemy pawns from advancing towards promotion unless they can occupy the file behind the advancing pawn. As well, a rook best supports a friendly pawn towards promotion from behind it on the same file (see Tarrasch rule).

In a position with a rook and one or two  versus two rooks, generally in addition to pawns, and possibly other pieces, Lev Alburt advises that the player with the single rook should avoid exchanging the rook for one of his opponent's rooks.

The rook is adept at delivering checkmate. A single rook can force checkmate while a single minor piece cannot.

History

In the medieval shatranj, the rook symbolized a chariot. The Persian word rukh means "chariot", and the corresponding piece in the original Indian version, chaturanga, has the name ratha (meaning "chariot"). In modern times, it is mostly known as हाथी (elephant) to Hindi-speaking players, while East Asian chess games such as xiangqi and shogi have names also meaning chariot (車) for the same piece.

Persian war chariots were heavily armored, carrying a driver and at least one ranged-weapon bearer, such as an archer. The sides of the chariot were built to resemble fortified stone work, giving the impression of small, mobile buildings, causing terror on the battlefield.

In Europe, the castle or tower appears for the first time in the 16th century in  Vida's 1550 Ludus Scacchia, and then as a tower on the back of an elephant. In time, the elephant disappeared and only the tower was used as the piece.

In the West, the rook is almost universally represented as a crenellated turret. The piece is called torre ("tower") in Italian, Portuguese, Catalan and Spanish; tour in French; toren in Dutch; Turm in German; torn in Swedish; and torni in Finnish. In Hungarian, it is bástya ("bastion") and in Hebrew ,it is called צריח (meaning "turret"). In the British Museum's collection of the medieval Lewis chess pieces, the rooks appear as stern warders, or wild-eyed berserker warriors.

Rooks are usually similar in appearance to small castles; thus, a rook is sometimes called a "castle", though modern chess literature rarely, if ever, uses this term.

In some languages, the rook is called a ship: Thai เรือ, Armenian Նավակ, Russian ладья, Javanese ꦥꦿꦲꦸ. This may be because of the use of an Arabic style V-shaped rook piece, which some may have mistaken for a ship. Murray argued that the Javanese could not visualize a chariot moving through the jungles in sweeping fashion as the rook. The only vehicle that moved in straight fashion was ship, thus they replaced it with prahu. Murray, however, did not give an explanation of why the Russians call the piece a "ship".

Peter Tyson suggests that there is a correlation between the name of the piece and the word rukh, a mythical giant bird of prey from Persian mythology.

In South Slavic languages, it is called the "cannon" (Топ, Romanised top).

In Kannada, it is known as ಆನೆ (āāne), meaning "elephant". This is unusual, as the term for elephant is in many other languages applied to the bishop.

Name translations

Heraldry
 Chess rooks frequently occur as heraldic charges. Heraldic rooks are usually shown as they looked in medieval chess sets, with the usual battlements replaced by two outward-curving horns. They occur in arms from around the 13th century onwards.

In Canadian heraldry, the chess rook is the cadency mark of a fifth daughter.

Unicode

Unicode defines two codepoints for rook:

♖ U+2656 White Chess Rook (HTML &#9814;)

♜ U+265C Black Chess Rook (HTML &#9820;)

See also
 Rook and pawn versus rook endgame
 Tarrasch rule – rooks belong behind passed pawns
 Lucena position – winning position
 Philidor position – drawing position

Notes

References

External links

 Piececlopedia: Rook by Fergus Duniho and Hans Bodlaender, The Chess Variant Pages

Chess pieces
Castles
Roc (mythology)